White Comanche or Comanche blanco or Rio Hondo is a 1968 Spaghetti Western starring William Shatner in two roles.

The film is listed in Golden Raspberry Award founder John Wilson's book The Official Razzie Movie Guide as one of the 100 Most Enjoyably Bad Movies Ever Made.

Plot
Drifter Johnny Moon (William Shatner) is frequently attacked as he is mistaken for his twin brother Notah who leads Comanche war parties in attacks on the white population whilst he is having visions on peyote.  Johnny travels to a Comanche encampment where he challenges his brother to a fight to the death in the town of Rio Hondo.

When Johnny rides into Rio Hondo he finds the town is at boiling point between two warring factions with only Sheriff Logan (Joseph Cotten) keeping the peace.  One of the factions discovers Johnny's prowess with his six gun and tries to hire him.  Johnny says he will give his answer in four days, after the climax with his brother.

Cast
William Shatner as Johnny Moon / Notah
Joseph Cotten as Sheriff Logan
Rosanna Yanni as Kelly
Perla Cristal as White Fawn
Mariano Vidal Molina as General Garcia
Luis Prendes as Jed Grimes
Barta Barri as Mayor Bolker
Vicente Roca as Ellis
Luis Rivera as Kah To
Victor Israel as Carter

Production
William Shatner travelled to Spain In March 1967 during a break from his shooting schedule for the Star Trek television show. Producer Sam White recalled that Shatner tried to get the NBC network to buy the film to show on television.

Notes

External links 
 
 

1969 films
1969 Western (genre) films
Films shot in Madrid
Spaghetti Western films
1960s Spanish-language films
Spanish Western (genre) films
1960s Italian films